Ahmed Landolsi is a Tunisian actor.

Biography 
He owns a casting agency for commercials, clips and appearances for variety shows.

Filmography

Cinema 
 2004 : Noce d'été by Mokhtar Ladjimi (guest of honor)
 2006 : Making of by Nouri Bouzid (guest of honor)
 2008 : Le Projet (short film) by Mohamed Ali Nahdi : Sami
 2018 :
 Stouche by Karim Berrhouma : the autopsy nurse 1
 Damergi by Karim Berrhouma : Naceur Damergi
 Gauche... droite by Moutia Dridi
 2020 : Dajjal by Karim Berrhouma
 2021 : Hadés by Mohamed Khalil Bahri

Television

Series 
 2004 : Loutil (L'Hôtel) by Slaheddine Essid (guest of honor episode 11) : the hotel visitor
 2005 : Aoudat Al Minyar by Habib Mselmani and Ali Louati (guest of honor)
 2006 :
 Hayet w Amani by Mohamed Ghodbane (guest of honor episode 5) : Hechmi Abdelwerith
 Hkeyet El Eroui by Habib Jemni (guest of honor) : Hassen
 2007 :
 Layali el bidh by Habib Mselmani : Haïthem
 Choufli Hal by Slaheddine Essid (guest of honor of episodes 3, 4, 9 and 17 of season 1) : Hédi Balha, Amani's boyfriend
 2008–2014 : Maktoub by Sami Fehri : Mehdi Néji
 2009 : Who Was Jesus by Alexander Marengo : Jesus
 2010 : Casting by Sami Fehri : Ahmed Radhouane
 2013 : Yawmiyat Imraa by Khalida Chibeni : Fehmi
 2015 :
 School (season 2) by Rania Gabsi and Sofien Letaiem : Raeef
 Naouret El Hawa by Madih Belaïd (guest of honor of episode 4 of season 2) : Kamel
 2015–2017 : Awled Moufida by Sami Fehri : Zied
 2016 : Bolice 2.0 by Majdi Smiri (episode 3 guest of honor) : Si Ahmed
 2016–2017 : Flashback by Mourad Ben Cheikh : Faycel
 2018 :
 Familia Lol by Nejib Mnasria (episode 3 guest of honor) : the tenant of the house
 Tej El Hadhra by Sami Fehri : Mustapha Khaznadar
 2019 : Machair by Muhammet Gök : Kacem
 2020 : Galb El Dhib by Bassem Hamraoui (guest of honor from episodes 1 to 6) : Si Sadok
 2021 :
 16/16 by Hamdi Jouini : Alexya
 Machair 2 by Muhammet Gök : Kacem

TV movies 
 2012 : Le Tireur d'élite by Yosri Bouassida : Adnene Zarrouk

TV Programs

 2013 : ITech on Ettounsiya TV : TV Presenter
 2014 :
Taxi 2 (episode 24) on Nessma TV : Guest
L'anglizi (The English) (episode 7) on Tunisna TV : Guest
 2015 : Belmakchouf with Adel Bouhlel on Hannibal TV : Guest
 2017 : Sadma on MBC 1 : TV Presenter
 2018 :
Abdelli Showtime with Lotfi Abdelli (episode 2 of season 2) on Attessia TV : Guest
Labès (season 7) with Naoufel Ouertani (part 3 of episode 7) on Attessia TV : Guest
Ramzi hal Tahlom with Ramzi Abdeljaoued on Attessia TV : Guest
 2019 :
Labès (saison 8) with Naoufel Ouertani on Attessia TV : Guest
Ethhak Maana (Laugh with us) with Naoufel Ouertani (season 1) on Attessia TV : columnist
 2020 :
Abdelli Showtime with Lotfi Abdelli (episode 10 of season 3) on Attessia TV : Guest
Battle Chef on Attessia TV :TV Presenter
El Weekend with Afef Gharbi on Attessia TV : Guest
Fekret Sami Fehri (Sami Fehri's Idea) with Hedy Zaiem on El Hiwar El Tounsi (episode 2 of season 2) : Guest
Familya Time with Jihen Milad on Attessia TV (First Part of episode 12) : Guest
Sayef Maana with Naoufel Ouertani on Attessia TV (Second & Third Part of episode 13) : Guest
Alech Lé? (Why Not ?) with Khouloud Mabrouk on Carthage+ (Second Episode) : Guest of Episode 2
 2021 :
Labès (season 10) with Naoufel Ouertani on Attessia TV : Guest of episode 14 (part 4)
Minute 60 with Naoufel Ouertani on Mosaïque FM : Guest
Star Time with Oumaima Ayari on Radio IFM : Guest
Romdhane Show sur Mosaïque FM avec Malek El Ouni et Hédi Zaiem : Guest
Sahri Bahri on Tunisna TV with Youssef Bahri : Guest
Only He whio stays up with Naoufel Ouertani on Attessia TV : Guest of episode 28
What Granma Told Us with Wajiha Jendoubi on Radio Med : Guest
Be Cool on Radio Med : Guest
 2022 :
Labès (season 11) with Naoufel Ouertani on El Hiwar El Tounsi : Guest of part 1 of episode 16 of season 11
Kmiss 3lik with Fayçal Hdhiri on Tunisna TV : Guest
 Sakarli El Barnamej (End The Show) with Ala Chebbi : Guest of Episode 1 of season 1 on Carthage+
 Labès with Naoufel of Naoufel Ouertani on Attessia TV : Invité

Clips 
 2016 : Ikertbet by Imen Cherif
 2019 : Manich Behi by Klay BBj
 2020 : Mosrar by Zahra Fares

References

External links 

Tunisian male film actors
People from Tunis
Living people
21st-century Tunisian male actors
1983 births